Westbrookville is a hamlet in the town of Deerpark in Orange County, New York, United States, along US 209. Westbrookville was named for Dirck Van Keuren Westbrook, an early settler. Fort Westbrook, dating back to the American Revolution, is extant. The 1900-1940 US Census lists it as part of Mamakating in Sullivan County. Situated between Port Jervis and Wurtsboro, it is close to the borders of Pennsylvania and New Jersey. Westbrookville is located within the Port Jervis City School District. It contains many small businesses and Westbrookville Cemetery.

The hamlet once housed the J. E. Ashworth & Sons blanket mill.

According to the Census Bureau, New York's center of population is located three miles away from Westbrookville in the hamlet to its south, Cuddebackville.

Notable people

H. Frank Bigger – Orange County Sheriff (1994–2002)

Karl A. Brabenec – New York State Assemblyman, 98th District (2014–present)

Images

References

External links
 The Town of Deerpark Website

 
Hamlets in Orange County, New York
Hamlets in New York (state)
Poughkeepsie–Newburgh–Middletown metropolitan area